Julia Elisabeth Roddar (born 16 February 1992) is a Swedish professional footballer who plays as a midfielder for the Washington Spirit competing in the National Women's Soccer League.

Playing career

Kvarnsveden IK
Roddar previously played for Kvarnsvedens IK.

Goteborg
Roddar joined Goteborg in 2017, making 70 appearances for the club over three seasons.

Washington Spirit
In January 2021, Roddar signed a two-year contract with the Washington Spirit competing in the NWSL.

References

External links 
 
 Florida Gulf Coast profile

1992 births
Living people
Swedish women's footballers
Damallsvenskan players
Women's association football midfielders
Kvarnsvedens IK players
2019 FIFA Women's World Cup players
BK Häcken FF players
Sweden women's international footballers
Wisconsin Badgers women's soccer players
Florida Gulf Coast Eagles women's soccer players
Washington Spirit players
Footballers at the 2020 Summer Olympics
Olympic footballers of Sweden
Olympic medalists in football
Medalists at the 2020 Summer Olympics
Olympic silver medalists for Sweden
National Women's Soccer League players